Wizards: Tales of Arcadia (or simply Wizards) is an American computer-animated fantasy limited series created by Guillermo del Toro, and produced by DreamWorks Animation Television and Double Dare You Productions. The award-winning series is the third and final installment of the Tales of Arcadia trilogy, following Trollhunters (2016–2018) and 3Below (2018–2019), and was released on August 7, 2020 on Netflix.

The first and only limited series in the Tales of Arcadia franchise, it is a fantasy time travel saga that explores the world's mythological origins and introduces a new protagonist in Hisirdoux "Douxie" Casperan, a former apprentice to the legendary Merlin who was forgotten for centuries and is now eager to prove his worth as a sorcerer in the eyes of his old master.

Wizards has been acclaimed by critics as a groundbreaking animated series, both for its complex storytelling and high quality animation. Alci Rengifo of Entertainment Voice writes, "...Del Toro wants everyone, even the adults, to get something out of Wizards. This makes it an adventure worth taking, like any great fairy tale." In 2021, the series won an Annie Award and the Kidscreen Award for "Best New Series," a category including all live-action and animated programming that year, and was nominated for four Daytime Emmys, including Outstanding Children's Animated Series.

It was followed by a full-length feature film titled Trollhunters: Rise of the Titans, released on July 21, 2021.

Synopsis
Following the events of Trollhunters and 3Below, Hisirdoux "Douxie" Casperan – who has secretly been the apprentice of Merlin for nine centuries – must recruit the Guardians of Arcadia to travel back in time to the 12th-century's Camelot. During the journey, the heroes learn why the amulet was built, how Morgana became the Pale Lady, and what events lead up to the Battle of Killahead Bridge.

Production
Wizards was announced as the third and final series in the Tales of Arcadia trilogy following the release of Trollhunters and 3Below. It was produced by Guillermo del Toro's Double Dare You alongside DreamWorks Animation for Netflix, with del Toro, Marc Guggenheim, Aaron Waltke, Chad Quandt, and Chad Hammes serving as executive producers. Waltke and Quandt served as head writers and co-showrunners. It was initially set to be released in 2019, but was postponed for August 7, 2020.

Voice cast

The series features an ensemble cast of voice actors returning from Trollhunters and 3Below, alongside new voice actors.

Episodes

Reception 
The series has a 100% approval rating on Rotten Tomatoes. According to Guillermo del Toro, Wizards: Tales of Arcadia was in the Top Ten most streamed series worldwide on Netflix during the week it premiered, drawing more viewers than all other live-action and animated content at that time. As reported by Screen Rant, Wizards was rated the best new Netflix Original Kids' Series released in 2020, according to IMDb.

Drew Taylor of Collider writes, "Everything about the world is fully realized with incredible detail... it really looks exceptional, and as the culmination of the franchise so far, it is hard to top."  In his Decider review, John Serba of The New York Post writes the show excels in "...classical myths reimagined with modern sensibilities, with vivid animation, crisp comedy and a muscular, but not too heavy, sense of drama. Del Toro's hand guides the series into creative avenues without ever being off the rails."

Rafael Motamayor of The Observer applauded the series for its bold deconstruction of Arthurian myth, which it uses to explore difficult themes like prejudice, ideological war, and racism. In his essay, he compares the series to del Toro's films such as The Shape of Water, with Douxie and the other heroes observing firsthand how history can be rewritten into false legends at the expense of the oppressed magical creatures Arthur and his knights seek to slay.

In 2021, Wizards won the Kidscreen Award for "Best New Series," a category including all live-action and animated programming that year. It was nominated for four Emmys, including Outstanding Children's Animated Series, and won "Outstanding Main Title for a Daytime Animated Program." It was also nominated for a Golden Reel Award for Outstanding Achievement in Sound Editing, and has received an Annie Award in the category of Best Voice Acting and a nomination in Best FX.

Accolades

Follow-up 
On August 7, 2020, following the premiere of Wizards, it was announced the Tales of Arcadia trilogy would be concluded with a full-length feature film titled Trollhunters: Rise of the Titans, set to be released on Netflix on July 21, 2021.

References

External links
 Wizards: Tales of Arcadia at Netflix
 

2020s American animated television series
2020 American television series debuts
2020 American television series endings
American children's animated adventure television series
American children's animated science fantasy television series
American computer-animated television series
Annie Award winners
Crossover animated television series
English-language Netflix original programming
Netflix children's programming
Tales of Arcadia
Television series based on Arthurian legend
Television series by DreamWorks Animation
Television series by Universal Television
Works by Guillermo del Toro
Television series created by Marc Guggenheim